The Madrid Skylitzes is a twelfth century illuminated manuscript version of the Synopsis of Histories, by John Skylitzes, which covers the reigns of the Byzantine emperors from the death of Nicephorus I in 811 to the deposition of Michael VI in 1057. The manuscript was produced in Norman Sicily and is now at the Biblioteca Nacional de España in Madrid, with the shelfmark MS Graecus Vitr. 26–2.

Apart from the very fragmentary 6th-century Alexandrian World Chronicle, it is the only surviving illustrated manuscript of a Greek chronicle, and includes 574 miniatures which includes depictions of everyday life in the Byzantine Empire such as boats, literary practices, sieges and ceremonies.

It is unclear whether these illustrations are copies of earlier Byzantine images or were newly created specifically for this copy.

References

Bibliography
 Color facsimile edition by Militos (Μίλητος) Publishers, .
 Vasiliki Tsamakda, The Illustrated Chronicle of Ioannes Skylitzes, Leiden 2002.
 Bente Bjørnholt and J. Burke, eds. "The Cultures and Contexts of the Madrid Skylitzes" International Medieval Congress, University of Leeds, 13 July 2004 (pub. 2005).

Further reading
Evans, Helen C. & Wixom, William D., The Glory of Byzantium: Art and Culture of the Middle Byzantine Era, A.D. 843–1261, no. 338, 1997, The Metropolitan Museum of Art, New York, ; full text available online from The Metropolitan Museum of Art Libraries

External links

 Biography of Basil II with notes on Scylitzes by Catherine Holmes
 World Digital Library page, and PDF download of the Madrid Skylitzes

Skyllitzes Matritensis
12th-century books
12th-century illuminated manuscripts
Byzantine literature
Byzantine illuminated manuscripts